How to Educate a Wife is a lost 1924 American comedy film directed by Monta Bell and written by Grant Carpenter and Douglas Z. Doty. The film stars Marie Prevost, Monte Blue, Claude Gillingwater, Vera Lewis, Betty Francisco and Creighton Hale. The film was released by Warner Bros. on May 1, 1924.

Cast    
Marie Prevost as Mabel Todd
Monte Blue as Ernest Todd
Claude Gillingwater as Henry Bancks
Vera Lewis as Mrs. Bancks
Betty Francisco as Betty Breese
Creighton Hale as Billy Breese
Edward Earle as Robert Benson
Nellie Bly Baker as Katinka

Box office
According to Warner Bros records the film earned $244,000 domestic and $28,000 foreign.

References

External links

 

1924 films
Lost American films
1920s English-language films
Silent American comedy films
1924 comedy films
Warner Bros. films
Films directed by Monta Bell
American silent feature films
American black-and-white films
1924 lost films
Lost comedy films
1920s American films